The women's 400 metres event at the 2006 Commonwealth Games was held on March 19–21.

Medalists

Results

Heats
Qualification: First 3 of each heat (Q) and the next 9 fastest (q) qualified for the semifinals.

Semifinals
Qualification: First 2 of each semifinal (Q) and the next 2 fastest (q) qualified for the final.

Final

References
Results

400
2006
2006 in women's athletics